Jamie Morrison (born November 12, 1980) is an American volleyball coach. He is the current head volleyball coach of Texas A&M University volleyball and former coach of the Dutch national team, which he coached at the 2017 Women's European Volleyball Championship.

Morrison is a past member of three Olympic medal-winning coaching staffs, working with the U.S Men’s National Volleyball Team that won gold medal in 2008 and the U.S. Women’s National Volleyball Team that won silver in 2012 and bronze in 2016.

Head coaching record

References

1980 births
Living people
American volleyball coaches
American expatriate sportspeople in the Netherlands
American expatriate sportspeople in Austria
Volleyball coaches of international teams
People from Laguna Beach, California
Texas Longhorns women's volleyball coaches
Texas A&M Aggies women's volleyball coaches